Kris Allen is the major-label  album debut (second overall) from American Idol eighth season winner Kris Allen. The album was released on November 17, 2009, through Jive Records.

Background
Allen has writing credits on nine of the twelve tracks on the album, including one solo credit for "Red Guitar", a song that he wrote prior to participating in American Idol. "Is It Over" was written by Allen with Cale Mills, who is an Arkansas friend of the Idol champ. According to a preview of the album, the tracks are: 

In a break with American Idol tradition, Allen's Idol "coronation song", "No Boundaries", was not included on his major-label debut, becoming only the second Idol winner album to do so after Taylor Hicks' self-titled album. Instead, a newly recorded version of "Heartless", covered by Allen during his run on Idol, was included as a bonus track. There has been speculation that this was because "No Boundaries" was already included on the Walmart-exclusive season 8 compilation album, which is the first time the winning single was included on the season's compilation since Kelly Clarkson in 2002 and is the first new compilation since season five. However, it has been included as part of the deluxe album version via iTunes.

The album was released in the United Kingdom on November 16, 2009, making its official release before that of the United States.

Promotion
Allen previewed three songs from his album "Written All Over My Face", "Can't Stay Away," and "Before We Come Undone" at a Miami Dolphins tailgate party before their game against the New Orleans Saints on October 25, 2009.

AOL Music began streaming the full album on November 9, 2009.

Release

Singles
 "Live Like We're Dying", a cover of the Script's song, was released digitally via iTunes on September 25, 2009. The music video for the single was released on November 6, 2009 on AOL's PopEater. The song peaked at number eighteen on the Billboard Hot 100, number ten on Pop Songs, twenty-one on Christian Songs, and other Billboard charts. It also charted internationally in Canada and New Zealand.
 "The Truth", featuring Patrick Monahan, the lead singer of the Grammy award-winning rock band Train, was released as the CD's second single in May.
 On October 6, 2010, Allen revealed on his Twitter account that the third single of the album will be "Alright with Me". He posted an unofficial music video for the song on his website on November 18, 2010 to thank his fans for their support.

Critical reception
Kris Allen was met with "mixed or average" reviews from critics. At Metacritic, which assigns a weighted average rating out of 100 to reviews from mainstream publications, this release received an average score of 52 based on 8 reviews.

In a review for AllMusic, critic Stephen Thomas Erlewine wrote: "Unhip it may be by design, at least Kris Allen delivers the goods: it’s tuneful and likeable, melodic enough to merit a close listen, ready to slip into the background at a moment’s notice."

Track listing

Credits and personnel

Performance credits
All vocals – Kris Allen
Background vocals – Billy Sollox, Eg White

Instruments

Bass – Mike Elizondo, Sean Hurley, Tobias Karlsson, Greg Kurstin, Danny O'Donoghue, Salaam Remi
Cello – Victor Lawrence, Mats Lindberg
Drums – Randy Cooke, Robin Diaz, Victor Indrizzo, Bill Lefler, Glen Power, Salaam Remi, Aaron Sterling
Guitars — Paul Broucek, Mike Elizondo, Jon Foreman, Andrew Frampton, Paul Inder, Tobias Karlsson, Bill Lefler, David Levita, Danny O'Donoghue, Tim Pierce, Joel Shearer, Mark Sheehan, Michael Ward, Eg White, Jordan Wright
Keyboards – Johan Carlsson, Mike Elizondo, Andrew Frampton, Steve Kipner, Greg Kurstin, Zac Rae, Salaam Remi 
Percussion – Victor Indrizzo
Piano – Zac Rae
Saxophone – David Ralicke
Synthesizers – Zac Rae
Trombone – David Ralicke
Trumpet – Christopher Bautista
Viola – Irene Bylund
Violin – Mattais Bylund, Jim Sitterly

Production

A&R – Jeff Fenster
Arrangement – Toby Gad
Horn arrangement – David Ralicke
String arrangement – Mattais Bylund
Editing – Mattais Bylund
Art directors – Maria P. Marulanda, Jackie Murphy
Creative director – Keki Mingus
Engineer – Christian Baker, Dan Frampton, Craig "The Regulator" Frank, Toby Gad, Warren Huart, Greg Kursitn, Ted Paduck, Franklin Emmanuel Socorro 
Assistant engineer – Phil Allen, Brent Arrowood, Robin Holden, Graham Hope
String engineer – Mattais Bylynd
Vocal engineer – Eric Weaver
Instrumentation – Toby Gad, Eg White
Mastering – Tom Coyne
Mixers – Serban Ghenea, Manny Marroquin, Spike Stent
Mixing assistant – Christian Plata, Tim Roberts
Producers – Mike Elizondo, Mike Flynn, Andrew Frampton, Toby Gad, Warren Huart, Tobias Karlsson, Joe King, Steve Kipner, Greg Kurstin, Eg White
Production coordinator – Chiara Krammer
Programming – Mike Elizondo, Andrew Frampton, Toby Gad, Greg Kurstin, Danny O'Donoghue, Mark Sheehan
Photographer – Eric Ogden
Project coordinator – Jolie Levine

Chart performance
The album debuted on the Billboard 200 at No. 11 with 80,000 sold for the week.

Charts

Weekly charts

Year-end charts

Release history

References

External links
 Official website

2009 debut albums
Albums produced by Greg Kurstin
Albums produced by Mike Elizondo
Albums produced by Salaam Remi
Albums produced by Toby Gad
Jive Records albums
Kris Allen albums
19 Recordings albums